Mohammadabad-e Tabar (also Romanized as Moḩammadābād-e Ţabar; also known as Moḩammadābād and Handavā) is a village in Tabar Rural District, Jolgeh Shoqan District, Jajrom County, North Khorasan Province, Iran. As of the 2006 census, its population was 327, in 92 families.

References 

Populated places in Jajrom County